(born 3 August 1948) is a Japanese former handball player who competed in the 1972 Summer Olympics.

References

1948 births
Living people
Japanese male handball players
Olympic handball players of Japan
Handball players at the 1972 Summer Olympics
20th-century Japanese people